Amchit Club is a Lebanese multi-sports club best known for its basketball team which competes in the Lebanese Basketball League.

Description
Amchit Club was founded in 1955 and has a long history of achievements in sports, cultural and social activities.

Today, it is still one of Lebanon's most active clubs. The latest achievement was reaching the 1st division basketball league in Lebanon with a result of 21 wins and 0 losses with the club competing in the 2012–13 season against the big teams. Center Hassan Whiteside would later be a part of that team with its record-breaking result.

Besides the various sports schools for all age groups (basketball, soccer, table tennis...), the club offers artistic and intellectual training programs (acting classes, dancing classes, language schools) and organizes social events every year. In addition, it is also the house of a "Scout Du Liban" group that has been continuously active for more than 15 years.

The club worked to renovate the stadium, form a professional basketball team and grow at all levels.

2013–14 season after the previous season was folded, Amchit club was forced to make massive changes to the team with 6 new players being added to the roster, including Fadi El Khatib, Karl Sarkis, Ali Fakhreddine, Jeremiah Massey, and including the signing of coach Ghassan Sarkis. Team captain Fadi El Khatib led the rebuilding effort Amchit, who would finish 3rd in their season and would face the team Homenetmen, 3–0 after swiping Homenetmen they would face Sagesse in the playoffs semi finals which will end there series 3–0.

2014–15 season the team merged with city rivals Byblos Club forming UBA Basketball club, many superstars left the team including El Khatib, Sarkis, Massey and coach Sarkis, during the regular season they signed coach Nenad Vucinic, under the guidance of Nenad they finished 3rd and would face at the playoffs against Mouttahed. By beating Mouttahed they would face at the playoff semi-finals against the Sagesse, which they would swipe them to 4–0. For the first time in their franchise history they would reach the Finals. UBA will face the defending champions Riyadi, which Riyadi will win the series 4–1. In the summer of 2015 Amchit Club departs from Byblos Club and due to financial reasons the club would be relegated to 4th Division.

Squad
Team roster in 2014

Depth chart

References

Basketball teams in Lebanon
Basketball teams established in 2012
2012 establishments in Lebanon